Piispanen is a Finnish surname. Notable people with the surname include:

 Arsi Piispanen (born 1985), Finnish professional ice hockey forward
 Markus Piispanen (born 1989), Finnish professional ice hockey winger
 Toni Piispanen (born 1976), Paralympic athlete for Finland
 Ville Piispanen (born 1983), Finnish professional boxer

Finnish-language surnames